Zeine Ould Zeidane (born 1966) is a Mauritanian economist and politician. He placed third as a candidate in the March 2007 presidential election, and he subsequently served as Prime Minister from April 2007 to May 2008.

Biography 
Born in Tamchekett, Zeidane studied in Nouakchott, then at the University of Nice, in France. He taught briefly at the University of Nice before returning to Mauritania, where he taught at the University of Nouakchott before entering banking. In 2000, he was posted to the World Bank, while he later served as economic Counsel to the President of Mauritania, Maaouya Ould Sid'Ahmed Taya. On July 26, 2004, he was appointed by Ould Taya as Governor of the Central Bank of Mauritania. He was virtually the only minister to maintain his post following the coup of August 2005, leaving the position in September 2006 because of his presidential candidacy.

Zeidane announced his candidacy on December 18, 2006. In the presidential election, which was held on March 11, 2007, he was the youngest candidate, standing as an independent. He took third place in the election with 15.28% of the votes cast. In the election, Zeidane was considered by some to be the candidate favored by exiled former President Ould Taya. On March 17, Zeidane announced his support for Sidi Ould Cheikh Abdallahi in the second round of the election.

Abdallahi won the second round, held on March 25, and on April 20, one day after he took office as President, Abdallahi named Zeidane as Prime Minister. Zeidane took office on April 21. Zeidane's new government was named on April 28; it included 28 members and was composed of technocrats who were largely considered obscure figures. Three of the ministers appointed were members of the People's Progressive Alliance (led by Messaoud Ould Boulkheir, another presidential candidate who backed Abdallahi in the second round).

Zeidane presented the resignation of his government on May 6, 2008; Abdallahi accepted the resignation and appointed Yahya Ould Ahmed El Waghef to succeed him on the same day.

References

External links
Official 2007 campaign website 

1966 births
Living people
People from Hodh El Gharbi Region
Mauritanian economists
Mauritanian bankers
Central bankers
Côte d'Azur University alumni